The Christmas Box is an American novel written by Richard Paul Evans and self-published in 1993.

A Christmas story purportedly written for his children, the book was advertised locally by Evans, who was working at the time as an advertising executive. He placed the book in Utah stores and it became a local best-seller. This got the attention of major publishers who bid against each other, resulting in Evans receiving several million dollars for the publishing rights.

Released in hardcover in 1995 by Simon & Schuster, The Christmas Box became the first book to simultaneously reach the No.1 position on The New York Times bestseller list for both the paperback and hardcover editions.

Television movie

That same year, the book was made into a television film of the same title starring Richard Thomas and Maureen O'Hara.  As of 2009, the movie was being shown in the 25 Days of Christmas programming block on ABC Family, but was not part of the block in 2010.

Angel of Hope
In The Christmas Box a woman mourns the loss of her child at the base of an angel monument. The book gives a description of the monument, which is of a childlike angel with upturned palms and outstretched wings. The word "hope" appears on the angel's right wing. When reports surfaced that grieving parents were seeking the statue, Evans commissioned the construction of an angel statue matching the description in The Christmas Box. In 1994, it was placed in Salt Lake City, Utah on land donated by the city. As of June 2014, over 120 Christmas Box Angels have been erected, mostly in the United States.

See also 
 List of Christmas films
 List of Christmas-themed literature

References

External links
 
 
 

1995 television films
1995 films
1990s Christmas drama films
1993 American novels
American Christmas drama films
American novels adapted into films
CBS network films
Christmas television films
Mormon fiction
American novels adapted into television shows
Self-published books
Trilogies
1990s American films